Amedée Piguet was a Swiss wrestler. He competed in the men's freestyle bantamweight at the 1928 Summer Olympics.

References

External links
 

Year of birth missing
Possibly living people
Swiss male sport wrestlers
Olympic wrestlers of Switzerland
Wrestlers at the 1928 Summer Olympics
Place of birth missing